Safeway (also referred to as Canada Safeway) is a Canadian supermarket chain of 135 full service supermarket stores mostly operating in the western provinces in Canada. It was established in 1929 as a subsidiary of the American Safeway Inc., before being sold in 2013 to Canada's second-largest supermarket chain, Sobeys, a division of the conglomerate Empire Company. It is now independent from the American company (owned by Albertsons) but continues to use the same Safeway name and logo.

It is a participant in the voluntary Scanner Price Accuracy Code managed by the Retail Council of Canada.

History

Early years

Safeway Inc. established its Canadian operation as Canada Safeway Limited with nine stores in 1929 with headquarters in Winnipeg. In 1935, it acquired the 179 Canadian Piggly Wiggly stores. In 1969, Safeway entered the Toronto market by opening new stores, rather than by acquisition. The firm ultimately failed against entrenched competition in this market.

1970s and 1980s
Canada Safeway dominated the grocery store landscape in Western Canada in the 1970s and 1980s.  The company controlled 80 percent of the grocery market in Alberta in the 1970s causing the government to accuse Safeway of having a monopoly on the supermarket business, resulting in unnecessarily high food prices.  A judicial inquiry restricted the number of stores Safeway could open, and forced the company to close or sell some locations to competitors like IGA.  Some IGA stores housed in former Safeway buildings have operated successfully for decades, others ceased operation in recent years.

In October 1986, the Canadian Press reported that Safeway Canada took an $8 million loss by closing a prime store at West Edmonton Mall, which, at that time, was the world's largest shopping centre.  It was the fifth store Safeway had closed in west Edmonton.

Safeway also opened other supermarkets under the Food Barn and Food for Less names in Alberta; and the Safeway Superstore name in British Columbia.  Food Barn was similar to Safeway in terms of selection and prices, but the decor resembled a warehouse the size of an average Safeway store.  In the mid-1980s, the company launched Food for Less in the Alberta cities of Edmonton and Calgary, as a big-box, discount food store chain meant to compete with the Loblaws-owned Real Canadian Superstore, which had expanded to western Canada. Most Food for Less and Real Canadian Superstore locations were constructed within blocks of each other. Upon the Real Canadian Superstore's opening, Loblaws produced television commercials with an aggressive tone, taking direct aim at Safeway's higher prices. One ad featured a man holding a rolled-up Safeway newspaper flyer, while promising viewers they would find lower prices at the Real Canadian Superstore. While prices at Food for Less were meant to compete with those of Real Canadian Superstore, and be lower than Safeway, this was not always true.

In late 1987, Safeway acquired the 26 Woodward's Food Floors, which operated in the western Canadian provinces of British Columbia (16 stores) and Alberta (10). These stores were later rebranded as Woodward's World of Food.

Safeway closed Food Barn or re-branded stores as Safeway before the decade ended.

1990s
In western Canada shortly before the Hudson's Bay Company purchased and then closed the Woodward's Department Store chain in 1993, Safeway rebranded Woodward's Food Floors and World of Food stores to Safeway stores, though the interior of some locations kept the World of Food decor for several years, before being renovated into full-fledged Safeways. The Woodward's brand name vanished from the Canadian retail landscape as a result.

Canada Safeway gained a reputation for high prices. To combat this and the loss of market share to competitors such as the Real Canadian Superstore, Safeway staged a successful publicity stunt in which it closed all its stores for one day. Stores reopened February 17, 1993, with Safeway loudly proclaiming a new commitment to the lowest food prices and launching a marketing campaign, featuring a motif of large red arrows pointing downwards.

Safeway purchased full-page ads in newspapers, listing hundreds of products and their new, drastically lower prices.  Television commercials aired, featuring helicopters flying across communities, carrying the red arrows before releasing and dropping them into a Safeway parking lot.

The first ads aired a couple of weeks earlier, but were shrouded with much more mystery. These commercials made no reference to Safeway and consisted only of dark shots of several helicopters in-flight with the sound of helicopter motors as the only audio. They ended with a text message saying that something big was happening soon.

Safeway's new commitment to lower prices ignited a price war between supermarkets, much to the delight of consumers, that lasted for several weeks. However, Safeway's prices slowly crept back up as months passed, and within a couple of years, it abandoned the red arrow campaign altogether, and once again, Safeway regained its reputation for high prices.

Safeway also experienced labour problems in Edmonton in the mid-1990s. The company threatened to shut its stores if it could not reach a deal with the union. Rival Real Canadian Superstore purchased a full-page newspaper ad, offering to buy Safeway if there was such trouble. Eventually, Safeway workers began a weeks-long strike that sent many customers to competitors where they did not encounter picket lines.

By the mid to late-1990s, Safeway closed or converted existing Food for Less stores in Alberta to the Safeway brand.  As the Food for Less stores were much larger than a typical Safeway, the company either vacated the Food for Less locations and moved to new nearby structures, or divided the space as it was renovated into a Safeway and leased the extra portion to another retailer. In British Columbia, Safeway Superstores eventually became simply Safeway, ending confusion between Safeway Superstores and the competing Loblaws-owned Real Canadian Superstore.

In the late 1990s, the company launched a Safeway Club Card loyalty program. The company said the card would provide discounts to customers more conveniently than clipping coupons. However, months after the Club Card's launch, the company introduced coupons again. The card was discontinued on April 4, 2014 by Sobeys, who now owns Canada Safeway; however, the card can still be used at Safeway stores in the United States.

In 1999, the Safeway chain began selling gasoline at some of its new stores.

Acquisition by Sobeys
On June 12, 2013, Sobeys announced it would acquire Safeway's operations in Canada for CDN$5.8 billion, subject to regulatory approval.

As a condition of the deal imposed by the Competition Bureau in October 2013, Sobeys was required to sell 23 of its retail locations to other companies. Sobeys sold 29 of its locations (18 of them being Safeway locations)—15 to Overwaitea Food Group (particularly in British Columbia and Alberta) and 14 to affiliates of Federated Co-operatives (particularly in Alberta, Saskatchewan, and Manitoba) for $430 million in total.

In January 2018, Sobeys announced that they would be closing ten stores in Metro Vancouver, citing that the locations were underperforming. Several of the locations were later reopened under the FreshCo banner. In 2019, it was announced that another six Safeway locations in British Columbia would be converted to FreshCo in 2020. In Alberta six Safeway stores will rebrand to FreshCo in 2021.

Current operations
Safeway has 134 full service grocery stores mostly located in Western Canada: 173 in-store pharmacies and 62 fuel stations, 10 liquor stores, four primary distribution centres and 12 manufacturing facilities.

Safeway parent Empire Co. has been converting several stores in Alberta to the discount FreshCo brand as part of an expansion of that brand across Western Canada, with a planned 65 stores to come under the FreshCo brand through the conversion of some Safeway and Sobeys stores along with the opening of new stores.

Petroleum

Safeway has gas stations at some stores. Following the acquisition of the chain by Sobeys, ten Safeway gas stations in Winnipeg and Moose Jaw were converted to Shell as a pilot project. Sobeys also owns Shell-branded gas stations in Quebec and Atlantic Canada.

See also
List of supermarket chains in Canada

References

External links
Official Safeway Canada website
Sobeys Inc. corporate site

Safeway Inc.
Sobeys
Supermarkets of Canada
Canadian brands
Companies based in Calgary
Retail companies established in 1929
1929 establishments in Alberta
2013 mergers and acquisitions